Two submarines of the United States Navy have been named USS Dorado, the Spanish language name for the fish also known as the dolphinfish and the mahi-mahi. Dorado also the name of southern hemisphere constellation.

  was lost in 1943 during her first voyage, possibly to friendly fire.
  was cancelled in 1944.

United States Navy ship names